Wheatland Township is a township in Barton County, Kansas, United States.  As of the 2010 census, its population was 53.

Wheatland Township was organized in 1878.

Geography
According to the USGS, it contains two cemeteries: Schneider and Schoenfeld.

References
 USGS Geographic Names Information System (GNIS)

External links
 City-Data.com

Townships in Barton County, Kansas
Townships in Kansas